Daniel Sulmasy is an American medical ethicist and former Franciscan friar. He has been Acting Director of the Kennedy Institute of Ethics and on the faculty of the Pellegrino Center for Clinical Bioeticswas also named He is the inaugural Andre Hellegers Professor of Biomedical Ethics, with co-appointments in the Departments of Philosophy and Medicine at Georgetown.

Biography
Sulmasy holds a Ph.D from Georgetown University and an M.D from Cornell University, and he completed his residency, chief residency, and post-doctoral fellowship in General Internal Medicine at the Johns Hopkins Hospital.

Career 
His research interests encompass both theoretical and empirical investigations of the ethics of end-of-life decision-making, ethics education, and spirituality in medicine. He has done extensive work on the role of intention in medical action, especially as it relates to the rule of double effect and the distinction between killing and allowing to die. He is also interested in the philosophy of medicine and the logic of diagnostic and therapeutic reasoning. His work in spirituality is focused primarily on the spiritual dimensions of the practice of medicine. His empirical studies have explored topics such as decision-making by surrogates on behalf of patients who are nearing death, and informed consent for biomedical research.

He continued to practice medicine part-time as a member of the University faculty practice. He has previously held faculty positions at the University of Chicago and New York Medical College. He has served on numerous governmental advisory committees, and served on the Presidential Commission for the Study of Bioethical Issues from 2010-2017. He has also been a member of the Program Committee of the Greenwall Foundation Faculty Scholars Program in Bioethics.

He holds emeritus status at the University of Chicago, where he was Kilbride-Clinton Professor of Medicine and Ethics in the Department of Medicine and Divinity School, Associate Director of the MacLean Center for Clinical Medical Ethics in the Department of Medicine, and Director of the Program on Medicine and Religion.

Personal life 
Formerly a Catholic friar, Sulmasy left the Franciscans in 2012 with the intention to marry.

Publications & Lectures 
He is the author or editor of six books: The Healer's Calling (1997), Methods in Medical Ethics (2001; 2nd ed. 2010), The Rebirth of the Clinic (2006), A Balm for Gilead (2006), Safe Passage: A Global Spiritual Sourcebook for Care at the End of Life (2013), and Francis the Leper: Faith, Medicine, Theology, and Science (2014). He also serves as editor-in-chief of the journal Theoretical Medicine and Bioethics.

 The Healer’s Calling (1997)
 Methods in Medical Ethics (1st ed., 2001; 2nd ed., 2010)
 The Rebirth of the Clinic (2006)
 A Balm for Gilead (2006)
 Safe Passage: A Global Spiritual Sourcebook for Care at the End of Life (2014)
 Francis the Leper: Faith, Medicine, Theology, and Science (2014)
 He is currently working on another book on the ethical and spiritual aspects of care at the end of life entitled, The Hours of Our Dying (under contract with Oxford University Press).
 He is the editor of Theoretical Medicine and Bioethics
 Articles: Sulmasy has authored or co-authored over 200 peer-reviewed articles in prestigious journals such as The New England Journal of Medicine, JAMA, Annals of Internal Medicine, The Journal of Clinical Oncology, The Hastings Center Report, and the Kennedy Institute of Ethics Journal.  He has also published 45 book chapters.
 He has given frequent press commentary on bioethical issues for such venues as The New York Times, The Washington Post, the LA Times, CNN, NPR, ABC, NBC, and Fox.
 He is featured in the 2017 public television documentary, Your Health: A Sacred Matter.

Awards and honors 
Hastings Center Fellow. 2004
 The Johns Hopkins Society of Scholars. 2007
Pellegrino Medal, Samford University. 2009
Paul Ramsey Award for Excellence in Bioethics. 2014
  Master of the American College of Physicians. 2015
Linacre Award. 2017

Grants 
 National Cancer Institute 
 National Institute of Nursing Research
 John Templeton Foundation

References

21st-century American philosophers
Medical ethicists
Cornell University alumni
Living people
Year of birth missing (living people)
Hastings Center Fellows